The People's Daily is the official newspaper of the Central Committee of the Chinese Communist Party (CCP). It provides direct information on the policies and viewpoints of the CCP in multiple languages.

History 
The paper was established on 15 June 1948 and was published in Pingshan County, Hebei, until its offices were moved to Beijing in March 1949. Ever since its founding, the People's Daily has been under direct control of the CCP's top leadership. Deng Tuo and Wu Lengxi served as editor-in-chief from 1948 to 1958 and 1958–1966, respectively, but the paper was in fact controlled by Mao Zedong's personal secretary Hu Qiaomu.

Newspaper articles in the People's Daily are often not read for content so much as placement. A large number of articles devoted to a political figure, idea, or geographic focus is often taken as a sign that the mentioned official or subject is rising.

Editorials in the People's Daily are regarded both by foreign observers and Chinese readers as authoritative statements of official government policy. Distinction is made between editorials, commentaries, and opinions. Although all must be government approved, they differ sharply on the amount of official authoritativeness they contain by design – from the top. For example, although an opinion piece is unlikely to contain views opposed to those of the government, it may express a viewpoint, or it may contain a debate that is under consideration and reflect only the opinions of the writer: an editorial trial balloon to assess internal public opinion. By contrast, an official editorial, which is rather infrequent, means that the government has reached a final decision on an issue.

During the 1989 Tiananmen Square protests and massacre, the People's Daily editorial of 26 April, which condemned "unlawful parades and demonstrations," marked a significant moment in the newspaper's history. The editorial increased tension between the government and protesters, and top CCP leaders argued about whether to revise it. An article that compiles the most important editorials was released by the People's Daily during the student movement.

An analysis of the wording of all the issues of the People's Daily from 1995 to 2000 was used in the writing of The First Series of Standardized Forms of Words with Non-standardized Variant Forms.

The People's Daily is also responsible for the publication of the nationalistic tabloid Global Times.

Overseas editions 
The People's Daily also maintains a multilingual internet presence; and established the People's Daily Online (人民网) in 1997. The website of People's Daily includes content in Arabic, French, Russian, Spanish, Japanese and English. In comparison to the original Chinese version, the foreign-language version offers less in-depth discussion of domestic policies and affairs and more editorials about China's foreign policies and motives.

The People's Daily in recent years has been expanding on overseas social media platforms. It has millions of followers on its Facebook page and its accounts on Instagram, Twitter and YouTube. An unusually high proportion of its followers are virtually inactive and are likely to be fake users, according to a study by the Committee to Protect Journalists. According to a 2021 report by The Washington Post, the People's Daily Online provides overseas public opinion monitoring outside of the Great Firewall for various police, judicial, and CCP organizations.

Writing practices 
The People's Daily employs "writing task groups" of various staff to compose editorial pieces to signal the significance of certain pieces or their relationship to the official views of the CCP. These groups are published under "signatures" (i.e., pen names: 署名 shǔmíng) that may correspond with the topic and weight of a piece, and what specific government or CCP body is backing it, often with homophonous references to their purpose.

List of presidents 

 Zhang Panshi
 Hu Qiaomu
 Fan Changjiang
 Deng Tuo
 Wu Lengxi
 Chen Boda
 Hu Jiwei
 Qin Chuan
 Qian Liren
 Gao Di
 Shao Huaze
 Bai Keming
 Xu Zhongtian
 Wang Chen
 Zhang Yannong
 Yang Zhengwu
 Li Baoshan
 Tuo Zhen

Reactions 

During the AIDS epidemic, the People's Daily downplayed the epidemic domestically while "presenting AIDS as a relatively innocuous social problem for the country."

A 2013 study of the People's Daily coverage of the 2002–2004 SARS outbreak reported that it "regurgitated triumph and optimism" and framed the outbreak as an "opportunity to showcase China's scientific achievements, and the strength of national spirits, as well as the wise leadership of the party and effective measures to protect the lives of ordinary citizens."

In February 2020, the People's Daily published an article stating that the novel coronavirus "did not necessarily originate in China." In March 2020, the online insert of the People's Daily, distributed by The Daily Telegraph, published an article stating that Traditional Chinese medicine "helps fight coronavirus." In May 2020, the People's Daily stated that the novel coronavirus had "multiple origins." In November 2020, the People's Daily published a claim that COVID-19 was "imported" into China. In January 2021, the People's Daily inaccurately attributed deaths in Norway to the Pfizer–BioNTech COVID-19 vaccine.

In 2020, the United States Department of State designated the People's Daily a foreign mission, thereby requiring it to disclose more information about its operations in the U.S.

In 2021, ProPublica and The New York Times reported that the People's Daily was part of a coordinated state propaganda campaign to deny human rights abuses in Xinjiang.

The Onion parody 
In November 2012, American satire news site The Onion published an article where it declared North Korean leader Kim Jong-un as the 'Sexiest Man Alive for 2012'. In response, People's Daily republished the article with 55-page photo spread of Kim and tongue-in-cheek quotes from The Onion. They later took down the article from its site after realizing that it was a parody. The Onion later updated their article about Kim stating; "For more coverage on The Onion's Sexiest Man Alive 2012, Kim Jong-Un, please visit our friends at the People's Daily in China, a proud Communist subsidiary of The Onion, Inc."

See also 
 Mass media in China
 Xinhua News Agency and China News Service
 Xinwen Lianbo, the news program of China Central Television
 Qiushi
 Reference News
 Rodong Sinmun, North Korean counterpart
 Strengthening Nation Forum
 Yang Gang, deputy chief editor who committed suicide during the Anti-Rightist Campaign

References

Further reading 

 Merrill, John C. and Harold A. Fisher. The world's great dailies: profiles of fifty newspapers (1980) pp 264–72

External links 

 

 
Chinese-language newspapers (Simplified Chinese)
Communism in China
Chinese Communist Party newspapers
Multilingual news services
Newspapers published in Beijing
Publications established in 1948
1948 establishments in China
Daily newspapers published in China
Chinese propaganda organisations
Disinformation operations